Ulaanbaataryn Mazaalainuud  is a Mongolian professional football club from Ulaanbaatar. They compete in the Mongolian National Premier League.

References

Football clubs in Mongolia
1998 establishments in Mongolia